A big bet (BB) is the larger of two fixed bet amounts in a fixed-limit poker game. A big bet is used in the final rounds of a game to increase the pot amount and thereby enable the possibility of a bluff. Big bets are generally double the wager of the initial or small bet. Any multi-round poker game can use big bets to standardize wagers while maintaining a sufficient risk-ratio to encourage bluffing. Casino poker tables use big bets to set a limit to the amount of money a patron can lose in each wager.

Statistical analysis
Big bets are used in place of variable limit raises to add considerable risk to staying in a game until a hand is shown. This added risk enables other players to bluff or to win a considerable pot when proving that they weren't bluffing. Other methods of adding structure to poker games include buy-in limits and maximum raise limits. Some sort of table or bet limits are required in poker to keep a person with the "deepest pockets" from "buying the game."

Examples
While any multi-round poker game can use big bets, the unlimited buy-in nature of casino style play is best suited for BB limits. Casinos can advertise the relatively low maximum wager of the BB as a way of attracting players, and players can join the table at any time.

Casino-style draw poker
Big bets are used in draw poker during the final round of betting to weed out tentative players. In theory, only those committed to their hand after seeing their final cards will be motivated to wager twice as much as their previous bet. In practice, however, additional motivation for players to fold is usually needed in a single draw game such as: a half-pot limit, a pot limit, or a spread limit. No limit poker is only employed when table limits are imposed, thereby disallowing casino guests to join the table after play has started.

Texas hold 'em
In a $2/$4 Texas hold 'em game, the big bet would be $4, wagered in each bet of the last two cards. The $2 would be the small bet, wagered during all other bets of the game. Given that a small bet is generally half of a big bet and that a small blind is generally half of the small bet, the minimum BB in casino style holdem is four cents. On the other side of the scale, the largest required BB in regular play is that of $8000 at the Bellagio in Las Vegas. At this table, professionals like Doyle Brunson, Phil Ivey, Daniel Negreanu, Chau Giang, and Gus Hansen, along with wealthy tourists, are required to wager $8000 in each bet of each of the final two rounds of the game.

Omaha hold 'em
Big bets are used in Omaha poker to allow buy-ins of players at any time. Omaha Eight-or-Better has a greater odds of winning and therefore less motivation to fold with a tentative hand. For that reason Omaha Eight-or-Better is sometimes played in a pot limit betting structure instead of big bets.

Casino-style seven-card stud
Big bets are used in seven-card stud, generally after the last upcard, to motivate tentative players who already have a lot of money in the pot to fold anyway. By the last upcard, seven-card stud players have wagered an ante and three rounds of betting. With that much money already in the pot, there is little motivation to drop out during the final two rounds of betting, especially when there is a possibility that another player may be bluffing. The effect of adding the requirement of a big bet to the final two rounds of seven-card stud betting is that the game becomes one more of skill than of luck.

References

Poker gameplay and terminology